Keep It Right There may refer to:
Keep It Right There (album), an album by Marion Meadows
Keep It Right There (song), a song by Changing Faces
"Keep It Right There", a song by Diana Ross on her album Take Me Higher